The Plymouth Brethren Christian Church (PBCC) also known as Raven Brethren or Taylorites is a Christian denomination currently led by Australian businessman Bruce Hales. The group is a subset of the Exclusive Brethren, a Plymouth Brethren group. The PBCC was established in the early nineteenth century. At this time many Christians were becoming increasingly dissatisfied with the Anglican Church, which they deemed as too closely resembling the Catholic Church in doctrine and ritual.

Some of the most prominent teachers of the Brethren were living in Plymouth, UK. By 1829 the first permanent meetings were held in simple meeting rooms and these gathering places became known as those of the Plymouth Brethren. There are now over 50,000 people who identify as members of the Plymouth Brethren Christian Church. These people are spread across 17 countries including Australia, New Zealand, the Americas, UK and Europe.

In 2012, the group incorporated under the name Plymouth Brethren (Exclusive Brethren) Christian Church Limited.

Beliefs and practices

The PBCC believe that "God's principle of unity" is achieved by separating from that which they consider evil. Members of the group do not engage with television, radio, and the open internet.

The Brethren reserve all social activities for those with whom they celebrate the Lord's Supper (their name for the Eucharist), excluding even family who are not members of the church. Social activities include eating, drinking and entertainment. Eating in restaurants and staying at hotels, club and professional memberships, directorships, and shares are avoided.

Services on Sunday start with the Lord's Supper at 6 am and worship in small groups. At 10:30 the Bible Study meeting is held and other activities continue throughout the day. There are further meetings every night of the week. Two of their services are closed to those who are not members in good standing: the Lord's Supper and the monthly Care Meeting. However, they do hold 10 services a week, 9 of which are 'open'. Well-disposed members of the public are free to come to their gospel preachings and other meetings. In practice, most 'gospel preaching' has been done on street corners and although they do not seek to make converts, the desire is to spread the word of God and its benefits for mankind.

The addresses of senior Brethren men are recorded, transcribed by the Brethren publishing house in the UK and distributed to all members at a subsidized cost.

The Brethren encourage a traditional marriage and family life. Children live at the family home until they marry, and are required to marry within the fellowship. Physical contact between young men and women before marriage is not tolerated, and courting between couples is chaperoned. Men are expected to provide for their families while the women manage the household. A study of the Australian Brethren in May 2006 suggested that the number of divorced, single people in the Brethren is approximately 0.8% compared to 10.8% for the general population, although there have been a few separations without divorce. 
The aged and sick are usually cared for by other member families (possibly unrelated), although private (non-Brethren) nursing homes are sometimes utilised for the elderly. Few people not born into the Brethren become members, and relatively few of those born into the group leave.

Women are somewhat subservient to men; they sit behind the men in meetings and their service is to select hymns, not to pray out loud or teach. They wear a scarf or ribbon in their hair to signify that the man is head of the woman.  Brethren businesses are generally run by men, but some women do run their own businesses, are shareholders or directors in family companies or actively work in the family business.

Brethren members can drink alcohol at home, but being visibly drunk is frowned on and smoking and gambling are forbidden.

Discipline
Critics of the PBCC have accused it of controlling all aspects of its members' lives. The group's influence over its members is such that many who have left the group have had trouble adjusting to life outside.

According to the PBCC, the sect's disciplinary methods consist of 'shutting up', or temporary isolation, and 'withdrawing from', or excommunication. The church asserts that such measures are infrequent and only come about after long periods of pastoral care, and only when persons persist in behaviours which are against the principles set out in the Holy Bible. However, there are examples of persons being 'withdrawn from' for infractions such as disagreeing with the 'Man of God', a term used for the leader of the church.
A person who is 'withdrawn from' is excommunicated, and cut off from their family and community.

In practice, former members say that these disciplinary measures are often used by the PBCC's highly centralised leadership as a means of control; for instance, quelling dissent or questioning of the leadership.

Leaving the fellowship 
Leaving the PBCC involves significant sociological changes, including the termination of family and social support, psychological, cultural and identity issues, the loss of employment, and in many cases disinheritance. The impact of these changes has been described as 'clinical culture shock'. The PBCC asserts that excommunicated members are now carefully followed up to make sure they are not living in destitution, although it concedes that this has not always been the case. This claim is disputed by former members, including in testimony to the UK Charities Commission in the period 2012–2014. Within the PBCC, those who leave are regarded as having chosen the world and the devil against God, and separation is required because they could bring members into contact with differing views and behaviours. When someone chooses to leave the Brethren or is excommunicated, their parents, siblings, spouse and even children are required to 'withdraw' or disassociate themselves from them. This allows for no socializing from church members. Since almost all members work in other members' companies, being excommunicated may also mean that they have to give up their jobs, in addition to their family and their home.

Business 
Typically Brethren either own their own business or work for a business run by another Brethren member. Their businesses include manufacturing, distribution and sales, including in the fields of clothing, architecture, rehabilitation aids and food and the import and resale of industrial hardware including welding equipment and consumables. Trade unions are not permitted and the Brethren have even successfully fought regulations that permit unions to visit workplaces to talk to employees.

Brethren companies use computers, fax machines and mobile phones, but there is guidance so that sites considered perverse and morally degrading are totally blocked, this tool is called Streamline3 and is run by UBT the communities accounting company.

Brethren run private schools for their children between the ages of 8 and 18. Members are strongly discouraged from attending university because of the campus environment.{{Citation needed}} However, many undertake tertiary studies through distance learning, completing diplomas or degrees, typically focusing on accountancy or business studies rather than the arts. In 2005 David Bell, the Chief Inspector of Schools in England, praised the Brethren schools for their standard of teaching and said in his report that "the quality of teaching, most of which is done by experienced practitioners, is generally good." Because of the lack of tertiary education, the teachers are not Brethren. Their schools do use computers and other modern technology and their use of Zoom and Self Directed Learning has enabled them to cope with the COVID-19 virus. Brethren schools have computer banks and students have restricted access to the internet. They now embrace a wide range of technology and most students are supplied with a laptop and all schools have equipment for video conferencing which is used extensively to offer a wide range of courses for even the smallest and most remote campuses.

There are 38 Brethren private schools throughout Australia and 43 in the United Kingdom, 36 in the United States and Canada as well as others throughout the world.

As with many private schools in Australia, Brethren schools qualify to receive Australian Federal government funding.
In 2007, the Victorian State Government provided $1.08 million in funding to the Glenvale Exclusive Brethren School, which has a dozen campuses in Victoria. This was a significant increase from $370,419 in 2002–03.

In the United States and Canada, private schools are operated by Stirling Education, Inc., which is closely affiliated with the PBCC.

History

The Plymouth Brethren were distinguished from the beginning by a refusal to accept ministers or priests, believing that all members were saints, although in practice, John Nelson Darby became increasingly dominant in the exclusive branch of the movement during his lifetime. It was not until James Taylor Senior became undisputed leader of the Raven faction in 1910 that a stricter hierarchy emerged by which discipline was imposed and the centre of power moved to New York where Taylor lived. He established a norm that someone in leadership should be in their own business, not an employee (although Raven had been a civil servant) and began to speak of certain brothers as 'Levites' or 'the Lord's servants' who were especially able to interpret biblical truths.

In America, James Taylor of New York was beginning to be seen as Raven's future successor as early as 1897, and when Raven died in 1905, books of his sermons began to be reprinted around the world. By the time another letter from Melbourne was received in 1920, resulting in the departure of 40 assemblies mainly in Australia, the London faction was also known as the 'Taylor' or 'Raven-Taylor' party.

By 1929, it was alleged that Taylor denied one of the main orthodoxies of Christianity, that Christ the Son was truly God before his incarnation. Taylor had pointed out that the title of the 'Son' was not used till after the incarnation, pointing to John 1 as the 'Word', not the 'Son', denying the 'eternal Sonship'. This was reflected in the issuing in 1932 of a new version of the Little Flock hymnbook, always a touchstone of Brethrenism. 40% of the hymns in the older version were omitted as "inconsistent with the truth".

When James Taylor Senior died in 1953, there were two candidates for the leadership: Taylor's youngest son, James Taylor Jr (1899–1970), and Gerald R Cowell (1898–1963) of Hornchurch, Essex, UK, who struggled for six years for supremacy.

At the Central Hall conference in 1959, a decisive confrontation took place between Cowell and Taylor Jr. The latter proposed that more radical, immediate separation from 'the world' was necessary, while the former took a more moderate line. Taylor Jr won and excommunicated Cowell less than a year after the Conference, judging him 'unfit for Christian fellowship'. During the next ten years, 'Mr Jim' delivered hundreds of new edicts, demanding strict obedience on how people dressed, how they conducted their business, and banning beards and young people from attending university. Members were forbidden to eat with others – even family members – who were not in the movement, and they were not allowed to join professional associations. A considerable number of individuals and assemblies left the Exclusives during the ministry of Taylor Sr and even more under the leadership of Taylor Jr, chiefly as a reaction to the increasingly restrictive directives of the latter. Some of these leavers joined with other groups of Brethren (including others who left after 1970) or other local churches.

The Aberdeen incident of 1970 
Scandals began to appear in newspapers around 1961, but little concrete information came to light until after the so-called Aberdeen incident of 1970. In that year, opposition to Taylor Jr personally came to a head in meetings at Aberdeen in Scotland on 25 July, at which he appeared to be drunk, and was subsequently discovered to be engaging in an affair with a married Brethren woman. Very few based near the scene of the events stayed in fellowship with Taylor Jr − including just two families in Aberdeen and 200 out of 3,000 in Scotland. Others, especially those overseas, believed Taylor's supporters' line that he was a 'pure man' and that this incident was used by God to expose his enemies. Taylor Jr died shortly afterwards the same year. "The Taylor Brethren interpretation of events is rooted in the conviction that God had a vessel whom he would not allow to fail; Taylor spoke and acted as he did to bring out what was in others by provoking reaction, being willing to draw reproach on himself to do so."

Following this incident, those who separated from Taylor Jr continued to hold the doctrine and teaching of Taylor Sr but "rolled back" the directives that had been introduced during Taylor Jr's leadership. This fellowship further fragmented in 1972, and the party which broke away has since further sub-divided.

Developments since 1970 
After Taylor Jr's death, leadership passed to James H. Symington, a farmer from Neche, North Dakota.

Symington died in 1987 and shortly after, the leadership passed to Australian John S. Hales. Hales had been trained as an accountant, and did not encourage the faithful to make substantial donations to the sect out of their estates when they died. He established Brethren-only high schools around the world, starting with one in the Sydney suburb of Meadowbank. In 2002, Hales died, and his son Bruce David Hales, another Australian businessman, succeeded to the leadership.

In 2004, Hales reversed a long-standing Brethren tradition on political involvement and encouraged the church to support conservative political causes: in the US, large donations were given to the George W. Bush campaign, in Australia support was given to John Howard, and in New Zealand to the National Party. Internal rules were relaxed, including the dress code and rules on access to technology. Hales now travels the world in a chartered Cessna Citation executive jet at a cost of up to $5,000/hour.

Under Hales's leadership, meetings continue to take place once a day from Monday to Saturday, and four or five times on Sunday. Sunday meetings include the Lord's Supper (Holy Communion at 6am Sunday), a scripture reading/discussion meeting, and several preachings. The church encourages participation at meetings by all adult males ('brothers'); women ('sisters') may only choose and announce ('give out') hymns, and apart from joining with group singing, are otherwise silent in church meetings as required by the Brethren's interpretation of 1 Corinthians 14:34.

In 2012, the Preston Downs Trust (a Plymouth meeting room in England) attracted considerable media attention when the Charity Commission rejected an application for charitable status on the grounds that it could not be sure that it met the criterion for public benefit. In January 2014, they announced that, following legally binding changes to its trust documents, they would accept its application.

Klondike Papers 
In 2022, David Wallace was hired to find a former member of Plymouth Brethren Christian Church, and was paid through Klondike Lubricants, a company owned indirectly by PBCC. David Wallace found that former member, Richard Marsh, but Wallace instead decided to blow the whistle; and Marsh in turn helped Wallace compile several thousand emails and other documents, and Marsh called this collection "Klondike Papers", and also operates the Klondike Papers twitter account. Due to content in the Klondike Papers, the PBCC has been subject of exaggerated claims on social media that they are puppet masters of the Canadian Government. Even Richard Marsh refutes these exaggerations, saying “I don’t believe the PBCC actually control the government as such or that they are an integral part of any wider ‘christofascist’ organization... Their goal, which they have achieved to some extent in the UK and Australia at times, is to get ‘their’ politicians into positions of influence and/or to win powerful politicians over to their cause.” 

Canadaland made a three episode series titled "Ratfucker" referencing David Wallace's self described work of ratfucking. In the second episode of the series, Canadaland investigates Plymouth Brethren Christian Church revealing members are completely isolated from secular society and even isolated from other evangelical Christians in order to funnel all profits to Bruce Hales. In 2016 to 2018, Richard Marsh, had broken the isolation rule by whistleblowing of Deprox to UK officials on Specialist Hygiene Solutions, a Brethren owned company in the UK, causing the PBCC to excommunicate him. After leaving the UK, Richard Marsh has begun publishing online evidence of abuses by PBCC, which lead to PBCC hiring David Wallace to track Marsh down, which Wallace backed out as he believed PBCC was going to resort to kidnapping.

Criticism

Former members say that life inside the Brethren is defined by the "three Fs": family, finances and fear, with the strongest being family. 

Kevin Rudd (who was later elected as the prime minister of Australia) said in 2007:  "They split families and I am deeply concerned about their impact on communities across Australia.".

Despite his earlier criticism, in 2009 Rudd wrote the foreword for a book published by the group (as a fundraiser for the Country Fire Authority) and described the Brethren school, as a 'resilient community coming together in response to this crisis'.

Enterprises 
The PBCC run several enterprises that are not owned by the Church itself. The Rapid Relief Team, Universal Business Team (UBT), and OneSchool Global (OSG) are publicly listed on their website.

Rapid Relief Team 
The Rapid Relief Team (RRT) is a catering (food and refreshment) charitable organisation established in Australia in 2013 by the PBCC. The RRT is composed mostly of volunteers, and is composed solely of PBCC members. RRT has expanded beyond Australia to teams in the United Kingdom, North and South America, New Zealand and Europe. The clients of RRT are mainly other charities and government organisations.

In June 2021, PressProgress reported RRT was opportunistic in self promotion when partnering with Winnipeg Police Service. In a series of publicized emails, RRT was shown to trade publicity on WPS's social media as quid pro quo for food kits.

Universal Business Team (UBT) 
The UBT is a business structure of the PBCC, in which other PBCC business are a member in. This network of PBCC businesses gives member PBCC business more bargaining power.

Outside of business, UBT has been used by the PBCC for litigation (such as suing Peter Harrison of New Zealand after Harrison tried contacting members of the church after he had been kicked out)

OneSchool Global (OSG) 
OneSchool Global is a private school network exclusively for PBCC members established in the early 1990s.

In 2021, Sydney Morning Herald reported that OSG had $13.3 million in total revenue, and estimated $9 million of that revenue controversially came from JobKeeper (Australian Government stimulus payment.)

Exclusive Brethren and the media 

The PBCC Brethren have been the subject of quite widespread controversy and adverse publicity, at various times since the mid-1960s.

In early 2007 the Brethren began interacting with the media and appointed an official media representative.

A number of documentaries have been made about the Exclusive Brethren. These include Anno Domini – Doctrine that Divides – A BBC television programme (no. LRP1383E) first broadcast 26 September 1976,  Inside New Zealand: Leaving the Exclusive Brethren aired in New Zealand on TV3 Thursday, 18 August 2005., and Veracity: Breaking Brethren released in Canada on 27 March 2022.

The Inside New Zealand: Leaving the Exclusive Brethren documentary followed the experiences of five people who had left the Brethren. Shortly after its airing, Michael Powell submitted a complaint to the television station (TV3) stating that "the programme had breached the privacy of members of the Brethren, and was unbalanced, inaccurate and unfair." Upon review of the issues, the New Zealand 'Broadcasting Standards Authority' rejected the complaint on 22 February 2006.

Political involvement 
In general, Exclusive Brethren are apolitical since at their core they are a separatist movement. They will obey the laws of their country as long as they do not perceive them to contradict the Bible. They will meet secretly in countries that require religious groups to register with the government as this would be perceived as putting their church under worldly authority. In accordance with the dispensational teachings of John Nelson Darby, they view an apocalyptic future for humanity after the rapture of all Christians (Brethren and non-Brethren). Thus, they see no reason to be involved in politics because of the prophesied apocalyptic future that cannot be changed. There is a story among the exclusive brethren of a woman member who decided to vote every year and informed her husband of her candidate choices. In response, her husband voted for the exact opposite candidates to ensure the two votes cancelled each other out.

In recent years, the PBCC have modified this stance and have become more involved in politics, though until recently their activity was limited to behind the scenes lobbying of politicians. On the basis of religious conviction they have since the 1940s asked for and obtained exemptions to trade union legislation (both membership and representation in brethren businesses), compulsory voting laws and lobbied on abortion and homosexuality.

The Brethren made media headlines in 2005–6 with their political activities in both Australia and New Zealand, despite the fact that members are barred from voting in elections, even in countries that have compulsory voting. But lately Brethren members have been encouraged to work with elected officials "to express a moral viewpoint of legislation in relation to the rights of God". In recent times this has included political campaigning as detailed below.

In an interview with the Sydney Morning Herald, Daniel Hales, brother of Bruce Hales explained how they could support political parties and not vote: "I see it as a sin and you don't. So I'm very happy for you to vote because to you it's your obligation to the community. But to me, it's my conscience that doesn't allow me to vote."

Australia 
In the 2004 Australian federal election the Brethren were linked to political advertisements campaigning for the re-election of the Australian Prime Minister John Howard.
The advertisements were funded by Willmac Enterprises Pty Ltd, a company wholly owned by Mark William Mackenzie who is a member of the Brethren.
Willmac's contribution to John Howard's election campaign, of $370,000, was later investigated by the Australian Electoral Commission and is currently the source of an ongoing criminal investigation by the Australian Federal Police.

In September 2006, Prime Minister John Howard confirmed that he met with the Brethren, stating he has no problem with the group and that they are "entitled to put their views to the Government". In December 2006, The Age reported that Brethren representatives met with the Australian Attorney-General Philip Ruddock lobbying for family law changes to "ensure that a child is not subject to a radical lifestyle change without compelling reason".

Then Prime Minister John Howard met with Brethren representatives in his parliamentary office on short notice early August 2007.
The Brethren also approached the then Federal Opposition Leader, Kevin Rudd who refused to meet with them saying that he believes they are "an extremist cult and sect" that "breaks up families".

The media attention on the Brethren has been particularly active in Australia. In 2007, the Australian Broadcasting Corporation current affairs television program 'Four Corners' aired an investigation into a claim of secret campaigning by the Exclusive Brethren alleging that church elders had met with both the then Australian Prime Minister John Howard and the Treasurer Peter Costello and had allegedly provided them with their support. The programme revealed that the Brethren had a vigorous and largely untold political history going back at least to 1993, and provided evidence of a trail spelling out how its members have spent millions in state and federal elections and overseas, including the USA.

In the state of Tasmania, tens of thousands of dollars was given in a campaign against the Greens in the 2006 state election claiming the Greens policies regarding transgender and inter-sex people would "ruin our families and society".
 This led to a complaint to the Anti-discrimination Tribunal and some private individuals issued an apology to partly settle that complaint. Further legal action regarding this complaint is ongoing. The published apology however was paid for by an agency acting for the Liberal Party which has led to calls by former Senator Bob Brown for politicians to declare their relationships with the group and called for an anti-corruption inquiry into their influence.

In December 2007, the Brethren were accused of infiltrating local councils and bankrolling legal challenges to halt the spread of adult stores.

Canada 
In 2005 the Brethren attempted to influence a gay-marriage parliamentary vote by waging an anonymous campaign (identifying themselves only as CCP or Concerned Canadian Parents) using direct-mail and advertising with a full page ad in the Hill Times newspaper, a Parliament Hill weekly directed at Senators studying Bill C-38.

New Zealand 
In 2000, as a result of their avowed lack of interest and lack of involvement in the political process, Brethren-owned businesses were granted an exemption from legal requirements under the Employment Relations Act 2000 to allow union representatives onto the premises to talk with employees. As a result of the lobbying and other campaigning, there have been threats from MPs to change the relationship between Brethren-owned businesses and labour unions.

In the 18 months leading up to the 2005 New Zealand general election, a group of Brethren met with and lobbied many members of Parliament, particularly MPs of the centre-right National Party but also including the parliamentary leaders of the centre-right New Zealand First and United Future parties and the neo-liberal ACT party with no success. Late in the election campaign they spent approximately NZ$1.2 million producing and distributing to letter boxes at least eight pamphlets attacking the policies of both the socially liberal and centre-left Labour party and the Green party. Though not mentioning the National Party, the wording and colour of the pamphlets hinted at support for National. The leaflets appealed for the election of a "government that would prosper the country economically and govern in a morally upright way". The pamphlets caused some controversy and seven Brethren held a press conference in front of television cameras to explain themselves. This strategy backfired and contributed to Prime Minister Helen Clark's second re-election. The outing of the Brethren's activities were a major catalyst for the drafting of the Electoral Finance Bill.

Deputy Leader of the Opposition Gerry Brownlee expressed concerns about the Brethren's lack of political sophistication and loss of female voters for the New Zealand National Party at the 2005 general election.
Some National MPs have declared that they will not accept help from the Brethren in the future.

In September 2006, Leader of the New Zealand Labour Party and Prime Minister, Helen Clark alleged that the Brethren had been involved in spreading "baseless rumour, slander and lies" after accusations that her husband, Peter Davis, might be homosexual appeared in The Sunday Star-Times newspaper. She also alleged that the Brethren had hired a private investigator to follow Davis to dig up dirt. It was later confirmed that private investigators had been hired by members of the group to investigate Labour MPs.

In October 2006, Helen Clark mentioned the Exclusive Brethren in "mirth" during her opening speech at the Labour Party's annual conference. She also said that it was time to move on. Deputy Leader and Deputy Prime Minister Michael Cullen further attacked the group in his closing comments to the conference.

In November 2006 Nicky Hager published the book The Hollow Men alleging, among other issues, the involvement of the Brethren with the National Party. This was seen as one of the reasons for the resignation of party leader Don Brash, though that was denied strongly by Brash.

In April 2007 senior members of the Brethren considered setting up a group that would be politically active.

Critics asserted that the Exclusive Brethren's canvassing campaign was such that at one stage it had threatened the government of that country. Former New Zealand Prime Minister Helen Clark accused the sect of hiring a private detective to gather dirt on her and husband Peter Davis, who was photographed kissing one of the couple's oldest friends, Ian Scott, who is gay.
Due to the ensuing public backlash against the Exclusive Brethren's canvassing efforts, Brash's successor, Prime Minister John Key, explicitly rejected any assistance from the Exclusive Brethren during the 2008 election.

In January 2015, it was reported by various international media houses that a New Zealand man whose Armenian wife abandoned their child at birth because the child had Down's Syndrome, had previously been excommunicated from the Exclusive Brethren Church in New Zealand and all his family members including his ex-wife and their four children banned from having any contact with him because he had divorced his wife.

Sweden 
The Swedish tabloid newspaper Aftonbladet alleged that the Brethren funded an advertising campaign supporting the centre-right Alliance for Sweden in the Swedish 2006 elections. The advertisements and fliers were distributed by 'Nordas Sverige', an agency set up by Swedish business-owners who, while members of the Brethren, acted on their own initiative. Aftonbladet traced it to a company named 'Nordas Ltd' operating from Liverpool, UK, run by business-owners, also members of the Brethren.

United Kingdom
Controversy over the Brethren in Britain revolves around the alleged practice of "shutting up", where families or persons are confined to their homes, and is used to punish members who break rules. In May and July 2012, six girls from the independent Wilton Park School were allegedly confined for 37 days after making a Facebook page. This claim was denied by the school trust, who subsequently invited the local authority to investigate. Investigation later found the complaint groundless.

United States 
In 2004 the Exclusive Brethren held prayer meetings and took out newspaper ads supporting the re-election of George W. Bush as President of the United States. A committee, called the Thanksgiving 2004 Committee, formed by Brethren in Florida raised $530,000 for the ads supporting the re-election of Bush and of United States Senator Mel Martinez of Florida. $377,262 of this amount came from a single donor, Bruce K Hazell of London, England.
The committee raised none of the money in Florida, according to a report filed with the Federal Elections Commission. A White House spokesman later described the group as "shadowy".

Secrecy 
The Brethren have been accused of using defamation lawsuits to silence their critics. In 1984, the Dutch Open Brethren theologian Willem Ouweneel prepared to publish a German translation of his book about the history of the whole Brethren movement in which he discussed the Aberdeen incident. The Exclusives brought a suit on the basis that they 'felt offended'. The case was heard, and settled out of court, but he never published the German version, though he claims he had simply told the truth. In 1992, they brought a $3.2m case against New Zealand MP Nick Smith for his determined questioning of their behaviour in a family custody case. The case ended without a payment and the Brethren later apologized for the action.

In 1997, an ex-member, Dick Wyman, opened a basic guest book-type site which allowed former members to get in contact with each other and eventually became www.exclusivebrethren.net. In 2004, the Brethren filed a defamation suit against Wyman in the Minnesota district court. Faced with the prospect of massive legal costs, Wyman decided to settle, taking down the site and promising never to start another or pass on the information, while the Brethren paid him some compensation. A similar site withdrawnfrom.com lasted only months when it was added to the Wyman case.

A new site peebs.net was started up by a database specialist Tim Twinam, who lived in a log cabin in Vermont and took advantage of the possibility of anonymous ownership of websites in California. This grew to be the largest ex-Brethren site with 597 members vetted for genuineness. It had several levels of security allowing for greater privacy, an emergency button for those considering leaving or committing suicide with a worldwide panel of volunteers who could be contacted, and provided a clearinghouse for news about the Brethren. In 2005, Brethren's publishing house, the Bible and Gospel Trust, started 'fishing expeditions' to flush out who was responsible by threatening lawsuits against likely candidates. Eventually they found out and launched a copyright violation suit against Twinam in Vermont in 2007 over obscure documents that were allegedly published on the site, claiming $500,000 damages. After trying to fend it off on his own, Twinam had to employ legal help, pointing out that this was a classic SLAPP tactic. A settlement was reached in 2009 which allowed the site to continue but the Brethren continued to pursue him and in early 2013 the site descended into a permanent maintenance mode, possibly connected with a serious illness that Twinam was suffering. At least one other website has appeared to replace it.

Notable PBCC members
N.B. The following individuals were associated for at least part of their lives with the religious movement that has been known, since 2012, as the Plymouth Brethren Christian Church. Prior to 2012, it was not formally known by this name, and was commonly known (informally) as the Raven-Taylor Exclusive Brethren.

 Anthony Crosland — Foreign Secretary in Britain's Labour Government, raised in Plymouth Brethren. Maternal grandson of F.E. Raven.
 L. C. R. Duncombe-Jewell — raised in the Plymouth Brethren.
 John George Haigh — Serial murderer. 
 David Hendricks — Convicted of killing his wife and children but acquitted in a retrial
Watchman Nee — Respected Leader in the "Little Flock" movement in China after being excommunicated by Exclusive brethren for "breaking bread with sectarians."
 James Taylor, Jr. — Leader of one Brethren branch (a.k.a. "Taylorites") from 1953 to 1970
 Ngaire Thomas — Wrote the book, Behind Closed Doors, about her childhood abuse in the Exclusive Brethren.

See also
Behind the Exclusive Brethren

Notes

References

Bibliography
 excerpt on Amazon
 Nicky Hager: The Hollow Men: A Study in the Politics of Deception: Nelson: Craig Potton Publishing: 2006: 
 Roger Shuff: Searching for the True Church: Brethren and Evangelicals in Mid-Twentieth-Century England: Paternoster Press: 2005: 
 Ngaire Thomas: Behind Closed Doors: Random House New Zealand Ltd: 2005: 
 Rebecca Stott (2017): In the Days of Rain: A Daughter, A Father, A Cult. London: Fourth Estate and New York: Spiegel and Grau. Winner of the 2017 Costa Prize for Biography.

External links
Plymouth Brethren - The Exclusive Brethren Church  – official web site.
https://togetherwearebrethren.com.au/ - official blog site with FAQs.
 The Exclusive Brethren – BBC fact sheet from Religion & Ethics – Christianity category.
 Further information Four Corners Background information on Exclusive Brethren.
Where the assembly can be found now – Where the assembly is now.
 My Brethren – History and Ministry of the early 'Exclusive Brethren' 

Plymouth Brethren
Evangelical denominations in North America